In data compression, twin vector quantization is related to vector quantization, but the speed of the quantization is doubled by the secondary vector analyzer.

By using a subdimensional vector space useless hyperspace will be destroyed in the process.

The formula for calculating the amount of destroyed hyperspace is:

H(x) = 5.22 / 4m

Data compression